Paolo Ivani (born 12 January 1997) is an Albanian professional footballer who plays as a striker for Albanian club Devolli and the Albania national under-19 football team.

References

External links
 
 

1997 births
Living people
Footballers from Korçë
Albanian footballers
Association football midfielders
Albania youth international footballers
KF Skënderbeu Korçë players
KF Korabi Peshkopi players
KS Burreli players
KS Pogradeci players
Kategoria e Parë players
Kategoria Superiore players